Purin Phanichphant (born 1984 in Crown Point, Indiana) is a contemporary San Francisco based artist and designer who is known for his interactive installations. Phanichphant began his artistic career in product design in 2006 and then interactive art in 2014. Because of this unique background, his work combines buttons, knobs, screens, and a touch of code, which often result in interactive experiences for audiences. His work has been featured in museums, galleries and venues around the United States, Japan, & Iceland.

Education 
Purin received a BFA in Industrial Design and Human-Computer Interaction from Carnegie Mellon University in 2006, and an MFA in Product Design from Stanford University in 2011.

Teaching 
Purin has taught design courses on visual design and design thinking at UC Berkeley, Stanford University and General Assembly. Additionally, he has given talks at TEDxBangkok, Pecha Kucha Tokyo, Android Open Conference, and Web 2.0 Expo.

References

External links 
 Tricking Your Head To Follow Your Heart — TEDxBangkok 2015
 Pyramid Version Of Open Everything by Purin Phanichphant

Living people
1984 births
American installation artists
Artists from the San Francisco Bay Area
New media artists